The Trofeu Internacional Ciutat de Barcelona  is a tennis tournament held on outdoor clay courts at Club Esportiu Hispano Franès in Barcelona, Spain. It has been held since 2015 and is part of the ITF Women's Circuit as a $60,000 event.

Past finals

Singles

Doubles

External links
 

ITF Women's World Tennis Tour
Clay court tennis tournaments
Tennis tournaments in Spain
Recurring sporting events established in 2015